Bert Vogelstein (born 1949) is director of the Ludwig Center, Clayton Professor of Oncology and Pathology and a Howard Hughes Medical Institute investigator at The Johns Hopkins Medical School and Sidney Kimmel Comprehensive Cancer Center. A pioneer in the field of cancer genomics, his studies on colorectal cancers revealed that they result from the sequential accumulation of mutations in oncogenes and tumor suppressor genes. These studies now form the paradigm for modern cancer research and provided the basis for the notion of the somatic evolution of cancer.

Research

In the 1980s, Vogelstein developed new experimental approaches to study human tumors. His studies of various stages of colorectal cancers led him to propose a specific model for human tumorigenesis in 1988. In particular, he suggested that "cancer is caused by sequential mutations of specific oncogenes and tumor suppressor genes".

The first tumor suppressor gene validating this hypothesis was that encoding p53. The p53 protein was discovered 10 years earlier by several groups, including that of David Lane and Lionel Crawford, Arnold Levine, and Lloyd Old. But there was no evidence that p53 played a major role in human cancers, and the gene encoding p53 (TP53) was thought to be an oncogene rather than a tumor suppressor gene. In 1989, Vogelstein and his students discovered that TP53 not only played a role in human tumorigenesis, but that it was a common denominator of human tumors, mutated in the majority of them. He then discovered the mechanism through which TP53 suppresses tumorigenesis. Prior to these studies, the only biochemical function attributed to p53 was its binding to heat shock proteins. Vogelstein and his colleagues demonstrated that p53 had a much more specific activity: it bound DNA in a sequence-specific manner. They precisely defined its consensus recognition sequence and showed that virtually all p53 mutations found in tumors resulted in loss of the sequence-specific transcriptional activation properties of p53. They subsequently discovered genes that are directly activated by p53 to control cell birth and cell death. His group's more recent studies examining the entire compendium of human genes have shown that the TP53 gene is more frequently mutated in cancers than any other gene .

In 1991, Vogelstein and long-time colleague Kenneth W. Kinzler, working with Yusuke Nakamura in Japan, discovered another tumor suppressor gene. This gene, called APC, was responsible for Familial Adenomatous Polyposis (FAP), a syndrome associated with the development of numerous small benign tumors, some of which progress to cancer. This gene was independently discovered by Ray White's group at the University of Utah. Vogelstein and Kinzler subsequently showed that non-hereditary (somatic) mutations of APC initiate most cases of colon and rectal cancers. They also showed how APC functions – through binding to beta-catenin and stimulating its degradation.

Vogelstein and Kinzler worked with Albert de la Chapelle and Lauri Aaltonen at the U. Helsinki to identify the genes responsible for Hereditary NonPolyposis Colorectal Cancer (HNPCC), the other major form of heritable colorectal tumorigenesis. They were the first to localize one of the major causative genes to a specific chromosomal locus through linkage studies. This localization soon led them and other groups to identify repair genes such as MSH2 and MLH1 that are responsible for most cases of this syndrome.

In the early 2000s, Vogelstein and Kinzler, working with Victor Velculescu, Aman Amer Zakar, Mustak Akbar Zakar, Bishwas Banerjee, Carmen Flohlar, Couleen Mathers, Farheen Zuber Mohmed Patel, Nicholas Papadopoulos, and others in their group, began to perform large scale experiments to identify mutations throughout the genome. They were to perform "exomic sequencing", meaning determination of the sequence of every protein-encoding gene in the human genome. The first analyzed tumors included those of the colon, breast, pancreas, and brain. These studies outlined the landscapes of human cancer genomes, later confirmed by massively parallel sequencing of many different tumor types by laboratories throughout the world. In the process of analyzing all the protein-encoding genes within cancers, Vogelstein and his colleagues discovered several novel genes that play important roles in cancer, such as PIK3CA, IDH1, IDH2, ARID1A, ARID2, ATRX, DAXX, MLL2, MLL3, CIC, and RNF43.

Vogelstein pioneered the idea that somatic mutations represent uniquely specific biomarkers for cancer, creating the field now called "liquid biopsies". Working with post-doctoral fellow David Sidransky in the early 1990s, he showed that such somatic mutations were detectable in the stool of colorectal cancer patients and the urine of bladder cancer patients. For this purpose, they developed "Digital PCR" in which DNA molecules are examined one-by-one to determine whether they are normal or mutated. One of the techniques they invented for Digital PCR is called "BEAMing", in which the PCR is carried out on magnetic beads in water-in-oil emulsions. BEAMing is now one of the core technologies used in some next-generation, massively parallel sequencing instruments. More recently, they developed a digital-PCR based technique called SafeSeqS, in which every DNA template molecule is recognized by a unique molecular barcode. SafeSeqS dramatically enhances the ability to identify rare variants among DNA sequences, allowing such variants to be detected when they are present in only 1 in more than 10,000 total DNA molecules.

In mid-2019, Vogelstein started collaborating with the group of Martin Nowak at Harvard University. Together with their groups, they developed mathematical models to explain the evolution of resistance against targeted therapies. They showed that the sequential administration of multiple targeted drugs precludes any chance for cure — even when there are no possible mutations that can confer cross-resistance to both drugs.  Thus, simultaneous combination of targeted therapies (as opposed to sequential) is the preferred strategy as there is at least a potential for cure.

Citations

Vogelstein has published nearly 600 scientific papers. Vogelstein's research papers have been cited over 430,000 times.

In 2016 Semantic Scholar AI program included Vogelstein on its list of top ten most influential biomedical researchers.

Awards

 1990 – The Bristol Myers Squibb Award for "Distinguished Achievement in Cancer Research" 
 1992 – The Young Investigator Award from the American Federation for Clinical Research, now the American Federation for Medical Research
 1992 – The Gairdner Foundation International Award in Science 
 1992 – The American Cancer Society Medal of Honor
 1993 – The Shacknai Memorial Prize from the Hebrew University
 1993 – The Pezcoller Foundation Award from the American Association for Cancer Research
 1993 – The Richard Lounsbery Award from the National Academy of Sciences
 1993 – The Baxter Award from the Association of American Medical Colleges
 1994 – The Dickson Prize from the University of Pittsburgh
 1994 – The Ernst Schering Prize
 1994 – The Passano Award from the Passano Foundation
 1994 – The Howard Taylor Ricketts Award from the University of Chicago
 1995 – The David A. Karnofsky Memorial Award from the American Society of Clinical Oncology
 1995 – The Clowes Memorial Award from the American Association for Cancer Research
 1997 – The William Beaumont Prize in Gastroenterology from the American Gastroenterological Association
 1997 – Golden Plate Award of the American Academy of Achievement
 1998 – The Louisa Gross Horwitz Prize
 1998 – The Paul Ehrlich and Ludwig Darmstaedter Prize from the Paul Ehrlich Foundation
 1998 – The William Allan Award from the American Society of Human Genetics
 2000 – The Charles S. Mott Prize from the General Motors Cancer Research Foundation
 2001 – The Harvey Prize in Human Health from the Technion
 2001 – The Association for Molecular Pathology Award for Excellence in Molecular Diagnostics
 2003 – The John Scott Award from the John Scott Trust 
 2004 – The Prince of Asturias Awards in Science 
 2007 – The Pasarow Award for Medical Research
 2011 – The Charles Rodolphe Brupbacher Prize for Cancer Research 
 2012 – The New York Academy of Medicine Medal for Distinguished Contributions to Biomedical Science
 2012 – The Pioneer in Science Award from the American Research Forum
 2013 – Breakthrough Prize in Life Sciences
 2014 – Warren Triennial Prize 
 2015 – Dr. Paul Janssen Award for Biomedical Research
 2018 – The Dan David Prize for Personalized Medicine 
 2019 – Gruber Prize in Genetics
 2019 – Albany Medical Center Prize
 2020 – The Times 'Science Power List' 
 2021 – Japan Prize

Affiliations

References

External links
 The Official Site of Louisa Gross Horwitz Prize
Howard Hughes Medical Institute Bio
Science watch interview

Howard Hughes Medical Investigators
Members of the United States National Academy of Sciences
Richard-Lounsbery Award laureates
Johns Hopkins Hospital physicians
American oncologists
1949 births
Members of the European Molecular Biology Organization
Living people
People from Baltimore County, Maryland
University of Pennsylvania alumni
Johns Hopkins School of Medicine alumni
20th-century American Jews
21st-century American Jews
Members of the American Philosophical Society
Members of the National Academy of Medicine